Eric M. Meyers is an American biblical scholar and a biblical archaeologist. He is the Bernice & Morton Lerner Professor at Duke University.

Meyers has degrees from Dartmouth College, Brandeis University and Harvard University. He has served as President of the American Schools of Oriental Research.

He was honored with the 1982 Norwich Native Son Award.

Meyers is married to fellow biblical scholar and Duke professor Carol Meyers.

References

Living people
Old Testament scholars
Brandeis University alumni
Duke University faculty
American biblical scholars
American archaeologists
Dartmouth College alumni
Harvard University alumni
Year of birth missing (living people)